Djerf is a surname. Notable people with the surname include:

Lise-Lotte Djerf (born 1963), Swedish archer
Rasmus Djerf (born 1993), Swedish ice hockey player
Richard Djerf (born 1969), American mass murderer

Swedish-language surnames